Thanawat Suengchitthawon (born 8 January 2000) is a Thai professional footballer who plays as a midfielder for Premier League club Leicester City and the Thailand national team.

Having played for Nancy's youth system and the France national youth team, Suengchitthawon made his international debut with Thailand in 2021 and transferred to Leicester City in 2020. He played for their U23 sides and also managed to appear on the roster for the senior team.

Personal life
Thanawat was born in Suphan Buri but moved to France with his mother when he was young and subsequently obtained French citizenship in addition to his Thai one.

Club career
Suengchitthawon spent seven years with local team Neunkirch before signing for Nancy, at the age of 13.

On 19 September 2020, Suengchitthawon joined Leicester City on a free transfer, playing for the side's Development Squad. He made his first appearance in the Premier League 2 match against Blackburn Rovers on 29 September 2020. He was named on the bench for the senior squad against Manchester City on 3 April 2021.

International career
Suengchitthawon has represented France at under-16 and under-17 levels, thus eligible to represent France, in addition to his Thai origin.

On 12 April 2021, Suengchitthawon was named in manager Akira Nishino’s 47-man squad for Thailand’s 2022 World Cup qualification against Indonesia, UAE and Malaysia, as well as the friendly matches against Tajikistan. He made his debut on 29 May against Tajikistan in a friendly match. He was also called up by Thailand for the 2020 AFF Championship.

Career statistics

Club

International

International goals

Under-23

Honour

International
Thailand
 AFF Championship (1): 2020

References

External links
 

2000 births
Living people
Thanawat Suengchitthawon
Naturalized citizens of France
French people of Thai descent
Thanawat Suengchitthawon
Thanawat Suengchitthawon
French footballers
Association football midfielders
AS Nancy Lorraine players
Leicester City F.C. players
Championnat National 3 players
France youth international footballers
Thanawat Suengchitthawon
French expatriate footballers
Thanawat Suengchitthawon
French expatriate sportspeople in England
Thanawat Suengchitthawon
Expatriate footballers in England